Guccini is an album by the Italian singer-songwriter Francesco Guccini, released in 1983.

Track listing 
All songs by Francesco Guccini, with the exception of "Gulliver" by Guccini-Alloisio-Guccini.

"Autogrill" (4:52)
"Argentina"  (5:18)
"Gulliver"  (4:20)
"Shomèr ma mi-llailah?" (5:35)
"Inutile" (5:14)
"Gli amici" (4:43)

1983 albums
Francesco Guccini albums
EMI Records albums